The 111th Attack Wing (111 ATKW) is a unit of the Pennsylvania Air National Guard, headquartered at Biddle Air National Guard Base in Horsham, Pennsylvania. If activated to federal service, the Wing is gained by the United States Air Force Air Combat Command. It provides protection of life, property, and the preservation of peace and order when tasked to do so by state or federal authorities.  The Wing also provides operational and support units, as well as qualified personnel, to support wartime tasking and contingency commitments of any nature.

The 103d Attack Squadron is a descendant organization of the 103d Observation Squadron, formed on 27 June 1924. It was one of the 29 original National Guard Observation Squadrons of the United States Army National Guard formed before World War II.

Overview
Currently the wing uses General Atomics MQ-9 Reapers to directly support combatant commanders across the globe providing; surveillance, reconnaissance gathering capabilities, combat search and rescue, and weapons employment when called upon. The wing hosts several new tenant organizations at Horsham ANGB including units of the Pennsylvania Army National Guard and the U.S. Army Reserve, among others.

Units
111th Attack Wing's main units:

111th Attack Wing Staff
111th Operations Group
103rd Attack Squadron - MQ-9 Reaper

111th Medical Group
111th Mission Support Group

History

World War II

Constituted as 391st Bombardment Group (Medium) on 15 January 1943 and activated on 21 January Trained with B-26's for duty in Europe with Ninth Air Force. Assigned to RAF Matching, England on 26 January 1944. The group marking was a yellow triangle painted on the tail fin of their B-26s.

The first mission was flown on 15 February and 150 more were completed before the group moved into France in late September 1944. During the ensuing weeks the 391st bombed targets such as airfields, marshalling yards, bridges, and V-weapon sites in France and the Low Countries to help prepare for the invasion of Normandy. The group attacked enemy defenses along the invasion beaches on 6 and 7 June 1944. From June through September, the group continued cross-Channel operations, which included attacks on fuel dumps and troop concentrations in support of Allied forces during the breakthrough at Saint-Lô in July 1944, and strikes on transportation and communications to block the enemy's retreat to the east.

A total of 20 B-26s were missing in action during the 391st's operations from Matching before the group moved onto the continent, transferring to Roye/Amy, France (ALG A-73) on 19 September 1944. The group then switched to Douglas A-26 Invaders and flew its last mission on 3 May 1945 from Asche, Belgium (ALG Y-29).

The 391st Bomb Group returned to the United States in October and was inactivated at Camp Shanks, New York on 25 October 1945.

Pennsylvania Air National Guard
The wartime 391st Bombardment Group was re-activated and re-designated as the 111th Bombardment Group, and was allotted to the Pennsylvania Air National Guard, on 24 May 1946. It was organized at Philadelphia International Airport and was extended federal recognition on 20 December 1948 National Guard Bureau. The 111th Bombardment Group was bestowed the history, honors, and colors of the 391st Bombardment Group. The squadron was equipped with Douglas B-26B/C Invaders and was assigned to the PA ANG 53d Fighter Wing.

Korean War Activation
The 103d was federalized on 10 October 1950 along with its parent 111th Composite Wing due to the Korean War. Many of the pilots and maintenance personnel were split off and sent for duty overseas as individuals assigned to other combat units there.  Eventually the B-26 bombers were sent as reinforcement aircraft to Far East Air Force for use in Korea.

On 10 April 1951 the squadron and Wing were moved to Fairchild AFB, Washington and re-equipped with RB-29 Superfortress reconnaissance aircraft.  Based on the World War II B-29 Bomber, the RB-29s were instead configured with multiple aerial cameras for mapping and reconnaissance missions.  These RB-29s were used like the reconnaissance satellites of today, except they required actual over flight of the countries to be photographed. The 111th Strategic Reconnaissance Wing (ANG) was composed of the 129th Bomb Squadron (formerly the 3d Bombardment Squadron), the 130th Bomb Squadron (formerly the 29th Bombardment Squadron) were joined by the 103d Bomb Squadron (Light) from the Pennsylvania ANG which was redesignated as the 103d Strategic Reconnaissance Squadron (Medium).

On 13 June 1952, two 111th pilots were flying an RB-29 over the Soviet Union when they were shot down by a pair of Mikoyan-Gurevich MiG-15s. The RB-29 was never recovered, having crashed in the waters off of Vladivostok, Russia. The Pennsylvanian families of the Air Guard pilots were told they had simply "vanished" in a weather-reconnaissance flight near Japan. It wasn't until the fall of the Soviet Union and the opening of communist archives that the relatives found out the truth in 1993. It is unknown as to whether any of the pilots or crew of this aircraft were captured by the Soviets at that time.

When inactivated the ANG personnel were released to their parent units. The equipment and active duty personnel remained at Fairchild and were gained by the newly formed 99th Strategic Reconnaissance Wing.

Cold War Air Defense

The 103d and the 111th were returned to control of the Pennsylvania Air National Guard in late November 1952, and the units were re-formed at Philadelphia International Airport by 1 January 1953.   The 103d was re-equipped with the North American F-51D Mustang World War II fighter because of a lack of available jets at the time due to the Korean War.  It was re-designated as the 103d Fighter Bomber Squadron and assumed an air defense mission.  In 1955, Air Defense Command upgraded the group to the Republic F-84F Thunderstreak, and it received new aircraft.   In July 1956, the 103d FIS switched to F-94A and B Starfigher interceptors; to F-94Cs in 1958 and the Northrop F-89H Scorpion in 1959.

Airlift mission
In 1962, the unit transitioned from the F-89J jet interceptor to a large, heavy transport, the Boeing C-97 Stratofreighter, a double-decked, four-engine airplane.  The new mission moved the wing into the Military Air Transport Service (MATS), and its successor Military Airlift Command (MAC) in 1966.

In 1963, the 111th ended its 39-year history at Philadelphia airport and moved to brand new facilities on the north end of the Willow Grove Naval Air Station. From Willow Grove, the C-97 was used to transport troops and cargo all over the world. The unit's flying personnel were used heavily during the Vietnam War and over two hundred members earned Vietnam Service Medals for their flights into that war zone.

Airborne Forward Air Control

In 1969, the unit changed mission yet again, returning to its original roots as an observation unit. The new 111th Tactical Air Support Group initially flew the U-3A Blue Canoe, a Cessna 310, as an intermediate aircraft until it received the aircraft it needed for Airborne Forward Air Control (AFAC): the Cessna O-2A Skymaster. The O-2 was a two propeller aircraft used early in the Vietnam War for coordination between ground forces and fighter aircraft (the "O" stands for observation).

The Forward Air Control mission was sustained with the unit's switch to the OA-37 Dragonfly in 1981. The OA-37, was a heavier derivative of the T-37 trainer, and had been developed specifically for the Vietnam War. The unit made several deployments to Central America in the 1980s to fly with US allies there, who had been sold the A-37 as part of the US Foreign Military Sales program.

The A-37s were retired in 1988, and the 111th received the A-10A Thunderbolt II ground support aircraft.  It was also used as a FAC aircraft (OA-10).  Pilots continued their previous mission of providing AFAC and Combat Search and Rescue, although in a much more combat-worthy fighter. The A-10 allowed the wing to take part in the new deployments to Southwest Asia following Operation Desert Storm. The unit was re-designated as the 111th Fighter Group in 1992 and then as the 111th Fighter Wing in 1995.

Participating in Operation Southern Watch, the wing took advantage of this aircraft upgrade by volunteering for a 90-day deployment to Kuwait in 1995, to support joint combat flight operations for Operation Southern Watch over Iraq. Twelve aircraft were deployed to Al Jaber AB – a joint-use base by U.S. and Kuwait Air Forces. The base was fairly austere as it had suffered considerable war-damage from Desert Storm. Missions included Combat Search and Rescue alert, Kill Box flights over Iraq, Airborne Forward Air Control and joint training missions over Kuwait. About 40% of the wing participated in the deployment

Another interesting element was a small side deployment to Qatar. The 111th was the first Air Guard fighter unit deployed to Al Jaber and also the first ANG Wing to volunteer for a solo 3-month Operation Southern Watch deployment. The combat flight missions over Iraq were to enforce United Nations resolutions and occurred during the 1990s post Cold War era.

Ground Support
In 1996, the 111th FW pilots transitioned from the OA-10 AFAC mission to the universal A-10 "attack" mission. Now the pilots' primary task was to provide Close Air Support (CAS) for joint service ground forces, as well as performing AFAC and CSAR duties as before. This change to the normal A-10 role aligned the wing with all the other A-10 units in the active duty and Air Reserve Component (ARC).

The second 111th FW deployment to Al Jaber AB occurred in 1999, again to support joint combat flight operations for Operation Southern Watch over Iraq. Missions included Combat Search and Rescue alert, Kill Box flights over Iraq, Airborne Forward Air Control and joint training missions over Kuwait. Use of the A-10 was more limited than before, due to the aircraft's relative lack of a precision weapon capability [except the AGM-65 Maverick air-to-ground tactical missile].

Global War on Terrorism
Immediately following the 9/11 attacks on NYC and Washington, DC, the 111th FW voluntarily deployed on very short notice back to Al Jaber AB to support joint combat flight operations for Operation Southern Watch over Iraq and Operation Enduring Freedom over Afghanistan. Missions included Combat Search and Rescue alert and joint training missions over Kuwait. 111th Weapons personnel assisted in the loading of combat ordnance for the first sorties into Afghanistan in November 2001.

From October 2002 – January 2003, the wing was the lead unit for a short notice, voluntary, out-of-cycle AEF deployment to Bagram AB, Afghanistan. Bagram had been a massive Soviet base during the decade when they occupied Afghanistan (1979–89), but was almost completely destroyed in that period and civil war afterwards. The 111th aircraft supported joint combat flight operations with US Army, Special Forces, and coalition ground forces in Afghanistan. The A-10s were flown and maintained in the most primitive conditions, yet the 111th personnel flew 100% of the assigned tasking for their entire deployment – at four times the normal sortie rate of home. Other unique aspects of the operation were total 'blacked out' night-time operations (no lights on the field or camp – everything was done by night vision goggles); an extensive number of mines/UXOs around and on the air field; extreme weather conditions and enemy shelling using BM-12 107mm rockets.

Operation Iraqi Freedom
Upon returning to the U.S. in January 2003, the 111th FW again volunteered to participate in another SWA deployment to Al Jaber AB, Kuwait [fourth visit] from February 2003 – May 2003. The wing deployed for joint combat flight operations, in support of US Army, Marine and British ground forces as part of the initial phase of Operation Iraqi Freedom. Wing personnel were initially stationed at Al Jaber before transferring to Tallil AB, Iraq, midway through the initial campaign. Tallil was a former Iraqi air force base, which had not been used in a decade.

During this campaign, which included direct support for coalition armor forces during the entire invasion from the Kuwait border, through Basra and Baghdad, the wing pilots and maintainers successfully operated at a very high sortie rate. Tallil AB operations set another milestone due to its austere nature and forward location (which was essential to support the armor's thrust toward the capital).

The 111th Fighter Wing's achievement of voluntarily deploying to austere bases in two separate combat operations within a five-month period [2003] was part of the reason the unit was awarded the Air Force Outstanding Unit Award, with Valor, in 2005. It also was awarded the Reserve Family Readiness Award in 2003 and the ANG Distinguished Flying Unit Award in 2004.

In 2009, the 111th Security Forces Squadron was voted best Security Forces Squadron in the entire Air Force. TSgt Marc Berger was voted top cop in the entire Air Force also in 2009, the first member of the 111th SFS to receive such an illustrious award. TSgt Berger indicated he owed this great accomplishment to CMSgt Jimmy Finn, who was his mentor and his teacher.

BRAC 2005 103d Fighter Squadron inactivation
In its 2005 BRAC Recommendations, DoD recommended the 111th Fighter Wing be inactivated its assigned A-10 aircraft relocated to the 124th Wing (ANG), Boise Air Terminal Air Guard Station, Boise, ID (three primary aircraft); 175th Wing (ANG), Warfield Air National Guard Base, Baltimore, MD, (three primary aircraft); 127th Wing (ANG), Selfridge Air National Guard Base, Mount Clemens, MI (three primary aircraft) and retire the remaining aircraft (six primary aircraft).

This recommendation was part of a larger recommendation that would close NAS JRB Willow Grove, PA. DoD claimed that this recommendation would enable Air Force Future Total Force transformation by consolidating the A-10 fleet at installations of higher military value.    Despite appeals from Ed Rendell, the Governor of Pennsylvania, the recommendations were upheld and the A-10s departed during 2010.  The 103d Fighter Squadron inactivated on 31 March 2011.

On 19 March 2013, it was announced that the 111th Fighter Wing would be re-equipped to take over ground control of the General Atomics MQ-9 Reaper unmanned aerial vehicles (UAV).

Lineage

 111th Operations Group
 Constituted as 391st Bombardment Group (Medium) on 15 January 1943
 Activated on 21 January 1943
 Inactivated on 25 October 1945
 Redesignated 111th Bombardment Group (Light), and allotted to Pennsylvania ANG on 24 May 1946
 Extended federal recognition on 20 December 1948
 Redesignated 111th Composite Group on 1 November 1950 and assigned as subordinate unit to 111th Air Defense Wing: Redesignated 111th Bombardment Group, 1 February 1951
 Ordered to active federal service on 1 April 1951
 Redesignated 111th Strategic Reconnaissance Group, 1 August 1951
 Relieved from active federal service and returned to Pennsylvania Commonwealth control on 15 November 1952
 Redesignated 111th Fighter-Bomber Group, 1 January 1953
 Redesignated 111th Fighter-Interceptor Group, 1 July 1955
 Redesignated 111th Air Transport Group, 1 April 1962
 Redesignated 111th Military Airlift Group, 8 January 1966
 Redesignated 111th Tactical Air Support Group, 27 May 1969
 Inactivated on 30 June 1974
 Reactivated and redesignated 111th Operations Group, 1 October 1995
 Inactivated on 31 March 2011
 Reactivated in 2016
 111th Fighter Wing: Established as 111th Air Defense Wing, and allotted to Pennsylvania ANG, 31 October 1950
 Organized and received federal recognition, 1 November 1950, assuming personnel and equipment of 53d Fighter Wing (Inactivated)
 Redesignated 111th Fighter-Interceptor Wing, 1 July 1955
 Redesignated 111th Air Transport Wing, 1 April 1962
 Redesignated 111th Military Airlift Wing, 8 January 1966
 Redesignated 111th Tactical Air Support Wing, 27 May 1969
 Redesignated 111th Fighter Wing, 15 March 1992
 Redesignated 111th Attack Wing, 1 April 2011

Assignments
 Third Air Force, 21 January 1943
 99th Bombardment Wing, 25 January 1944 – 27 July 1945
 Army Service Forces (for inactivation), 24–25 October 1945
 53d Fighter Wing, 20 December 1948
 Pennsylvania Air National Guard, 1 November 1951
 Gained by: Eastern Air Defense Force, Air Defense Command
 Gained by: New York Air Defense Sector, Air Defense Command, 1 October 1956
 Gained by: Eastern Transport Air Force, (EASTAF), Military Air Transport Service, 1 April 1962
 Gained by: Twenty-First Air Force, Military Airlift Command, 8 January 1966
 Gained by: Tactical Air Command, 27 May 1969
 Gained by: Air Combat Command, 1 June 1992–Present

Components

World War II
 572d Bombardment Squadron (P2), 21 January 1943 – 25 October 1945
 573d Bombardment Squadron (T6), 21 January 1943 – 25 October 1945
 574th Bombardment Squadron (4L), 21 January 1943 – 25 October 1945
 575th Bombardment Squadron (O8), 21 January 1943 – 25 October 1945

Pennsylvania Air National Guard
 111th Composite (later Bombardment, Strategic Reconnaissance, Fighter-Bomber) Group, 1 November 1951 – 1 July 1955
 Re-designated: 111th Operations Group, 1 October 1995 – 31 Mar 2011
 103d Bombardment (later Strategic Reconnaissance, Fighter-Bomber, Fighter-Interceptor, Air Transport, Military Airlift, Tactical Air Support, Fighter, Attack) Squadron, 20 December 1948 – 15 November 1952; 1 January 1953 – 31 Mar 2011; ?? – present
 117th Bombardment Squadron, 17 January 1947 – 1 April 1951; 1 January 1953 – 1 July 1956
 129th Strategic Reconnaissance Squadron, 1 August 1951 – 15 November 1953
 130th Strategic Reconnaissance Squadron, 1 August 1951 – 15 November 1953
 142d Fighter (later Fighter-Interceptor, Fighter-Bomber Tactical Fighter) Squadron, 1 November 1950 – 10 February 1951; 1 November 1952 – 7 April 1962 (Delaware ANG)

Stations

 MacDill Field, Florida, 21 January 1943
 Myrtle Beach General Bombing and Gunnery Range, South Carolina, 24 May 1943
 Godman Field, Kentucky, 4 September–31 December 1943
 RAF Matching (AAF-166), England 25 January 1944
 Roye-Amy Airfield (A-73), France 19 September 1944
 Asch Airfield (Y-29), Belgium 16 April 1945
 Vitry-En-Artois Airfield, France 27 May – 27 July 1945

 Camp Shanks, New York, 24–25 October 1945
 Philadelphia International Airport, Pennsylvania.  20 December 1948
 Operated from: Fairchild Air Force Base, Washington, 1 April 1951 – 15 November 1952
 Naval Air Station Willow Grove, Pennsylvania, 1963
 Designated: Naval Air Station Joint Reserve Base Willow Grove, 1991–2011
 Re-Designated: Horsham Air Guard Station, 2011-Present

Aircraft

 Martin B-26 Marauder 1943–1945
 Douglas A-26 Invader 1945
 Douglas B-26B Invader 1948–1951
 Douglas B-26C Invader 1948–1951
 Boeing RB-29 Superfortress 1951–1952
 North American F-51D Mustang 1953–1954
 Republic F-84F Thunderstreak 1954–1956
 Lockheed F-94A Starfire 1956–1958
 Lockheed F-94B Starfire 1956–1958

 Lockheed F-94C Starfire 1958–1959
 Northrop F-89H Scorpion 1959–1962
 Boeing C-97 Stratofreighter 1962–1969
 Cessna U-3A Blue Canoe 1969–1970
 Cessna O-2 Skymaster 1970–1982
 Cessna OA-37B Dragonfly 1982–1989
 Fairchild Republic A-10 Thunderbolt II 1988–2011
 General Atomics MQ-9 Reaper 2011–Present

References

Rape jokes, vindictive culture in ‘old boys club’ at Horsham’s Air National Guard Station by William Bender, Posted: July 29, 2020
 Freeman, Roger A. UK Airfields of the Ninth: Then and Now 1994. After the Battle, 1994. .
 Freeman, Roger A. The Ninth Air Force in Colour: UK and the Continent–World War Two. After the Battle, 1996. .
 Maurer, Maurer. Air Force Combat Units of World War II. Maxwell Air Force Base, Alabama: Office of Air Force History, 1983. .
 Johnson, David C. (1988), U.S. Army Air Forces Continental Airfields (ETO), D-Day to V-E Day; Research Division, USAF Historical Research Center, Maxwell AFB, Alabama
 111th Fighter Wing history
 103d Fighter Wing lineage and history
 Rogers, B. (2006). United States Air Force Unit Designations Since 1978. 
  Cornett, Lloyd H. and Johnson, Mildred W., A Handbook of Aerospace Defense Organization  1946–1980, Office of History, Aerospace Defense Center, Peterson AFB, CO (1980).
 111th Fighter Wing@globalsecurity.org

External links
  111th Fighter Wing – Willow Grove JRB
 391st Bomb Group Website
 391st Bombardment Group Digital Collection at The University of Akron Archival Services
   B-26 Memorial in France "Hitch Hiker"

Wings of the United States Air National Guard
Military units and formations in Pennsylvania
111
Military units and formations established in 1943
 Pennsylvania Air National Guard